Survivors, is a 2018 Sierra Leonean documentary film co–directed by Banker White, Anna Fitch, Lansana Mansaray, and Arthur Pratt. The film was co–produced by four directors themselves with Sara Dosa, Samantha Grant, Justine Nagan, and Chris White. The film follows the Ebola pandemic spreading in Sierra Leone that infected 8,704 Sierra Leoneans and killed 3,589 and how the Sierra Leone's heroes eradicate the pandemic.

The film received positive reviews and won several awards at international film festivals. The film nominated for the Emmy’s Best Social Issue Documentary in 2018, becoming the first ever West African film to receive the accolade.

References

External links
 

2018 films
Sierra Leonean documentary films
2018 documentary films